See also Ektachrome for full details of Kodak E-series processes.

The E-4 process is a now outdated process for developing color reversal (transparency) photographic film, that was introduced in 1966.

The process is infamous for two reasons:

First, its use of the highly toxic reversal agent tertiary butyl-amine borane (TBAB) (not to be confused with tetra-n-butylammonium bromide, which also has TBAB as abbr.) – as of all boron hydrides. Early releases of the consumer-sized version of the chemistry provided the TBAB in the form of a tablet. This was later changed to loose powder (likely as a countermeasure against inadvertent ingestion of the substance). The use of the reversal agent permits processing of the film without the manual reexposure that its predecessor E-3 required. Kodak's official E-6 process, which replaced Process E-4 for almost all applications, avoids the necessity of TBAB by adding a separate reversal bath containing the tin salt stannous chloride.

Second, the first two steps in the process are prehardener and neutralizer. When the prehardener is neutralized, a noxious gas, which has been likened to tear gas, is generated. Process E-6 films are hardened during manufacture, eliminating the prehardener step and allowing them to be processed at 38°C (100°F).

The process is faster than E-3 and runs at 30°C (85°F, ± .5°F), about 6°C (10°F) higher than E-3. The ME-4 process was a motion picture variation of the E-4 process.

Process E-4 consists of nine chemicals: prehardener, neutralizer, first developer, First Stop Bath, Color Developer, Second Stop Bath, bleach, fixer, stabilizer

Total darkness is required during the first four chemical steps; normal room light can be used for the remaining five. The temperature tolerance is 1°F for prehardener, 1/2°F for the two developers, and 2°F all other steps.

E-4 processed film is color stable for about 30 years.

The process was phased out in 1976 with the introduction of the E-6 process, which is more environmentally friendly due to its lack of toxic chemicals.

The process has been discontinued but was used up until 1996 for Kodak IE color infrared film, due to legal commitment by Kodak to provide the process for 30 years.

References

External links 
 Kodak specifications for hand mixing of chemistry

Processing of older Ektachrome films (including Process E-4)
 Film Rescue USA and Canada
 Rocky Mountain USA

Photographic film processes